Jai Bolo Telangana ( Hail Telangana!) is a 2011 Telugu-language historical drama film based on the Telangana Movement, produced & directed by N.Shankar on Mahalakshmi Arts banner and Cinematography by T. Surendra Reddy. Starring Jagapathi Babu, Smriti Irani, Meera Nandan, Sandeep Singh and music composed by Chakri. Beginning with the 1948 movement against the annexing of Seemandhra region with Hyderabad into state of andhra pradesh, and the circumstances that arose since then, the movie covered the significant events until the tumultuous days at Osmania University in 2009. With the police beating up many peaceful Telangana agitators and Telangana people committing suicide for the formation of a separate Telangana state- all real life incidents. It also shows how politicians from seemandhra region have manipulated and bribed the media often.

The film has won five Andhra Pradesh state Nandi Awards, including the Sarojini Devi Award for a Film on National Integration, and was screened at the 6th South Asian Film Festival, held in Goa during September 2011.

Cast
 Jagapathi Babu as Rambabu / Krishna Murthy
 Smriti Irani
 Meera Nandan
 Sandeep Singh
 S. V Ranga Rao jr
 Meenakshi
 Deshapati Srinivas
 Allam Narayana
 Mallepally Laxmaiah
 Nandini Sidda Reddy
 Gaddar
 Vimalakka
 K. Chandrashekar Rao
 R. Vidyasagar Rao

Soundtrack
Music was composed by music director Chakri. The song, "Garadi Chestundru" was written by K. Chandrashekar Rao.

Awards
Nandi Awards
Sarojini Devi Award for a Film on National Integration 
Best Director - N. Shankar
Best Lyricist - Gaddar - "Podustunna Poddumeeda"
Best Male Playback Singer - Gaddar - "Podustunna Poddumeeda"
Best Male Dubbing Artist - R. C. M. Raju

References 

2011 films
2010s Telugu-language films
Films set in Telangana
History of Telangana
Indian political drama films
Telangana movement
Films scored by Chakri
Films directed by N. Shankar